The Qianjiang–Changde railway is an electrified higher-speed railway in China.

History
Testing began on 14 October 2019. The railway opened on 26 December.

Stations
The line has the following passenger stations:
Qianjiang (interchange with the Chongqing–Huaihua railway, planned interchange with the Chongqing–Qianjiang intercity railway)
Xianfeng
Laifeng
Longshan North
Sangzhi
Zhangjiajie West (planned interchange with the Zhangjiajie–Huaihua high-speed railway and Yichang–Zhangjiajie high-speed railway)
Niuchehe
Taoyuan
Changde (interchange with the Shimen–Changsha railway)

References

Railway lines in China
Railway lines opened in 2019